Powerglide is an automatic transmission tradename.

Powerglide may also refer to:

Powerglide (Transformers), a fictional character
Powerglide (album), a 1972 album by the New Riders of the Purple Sage
"Powerglide" (song), a 2018 song by Rae Sremmurd featuring Juicy J from the album SR3MM